Bunny is the second album of J-Pop idol duo, YuiKaori. It was released on 23 October 2013.

Track listing

References

Sources
 初回限定盤
 通常盤

2013 albums